Cuthbert James "Pinky" Burnup (21 November 1875 – 5 April 1960) was an English amateur sportsman who played cricket and football around the turn of the 20th century. Burnup played once for the England football team but is more renowned for playing over 200 first-class cricket matches, mainly for Kent County Cricket Club. He was named as one of Wisdens Cricketers of the Year in 1903.

Early life and education
Burnup was born in Blackheath, then part of the county of Kent, the son of J. M. Burnup. He was educated at Malvern School, where he captained the school cricket and racquets teams, and, from 1894, Clare College, Cambridge, gaining Blues in football and cricket. Burnup played for Cambridge University Cricket Club for three years from 1896, leading the university in runs scored in both 1896 and 1898, and the University football team from 1895 to 1898.

Football career
Burnup played 79 matches for Corinthian F.C. between 1894 and 1901, scoring 28 times. He played on the left wing and was considered a quick player who could dribble the ball effectively. He toured with Corinthian to South Africa in 1897 and helped the club win the London Charity Cup in the same year. He also played for Old Malvernians F.C.

Whilst at Cambridge, Burnup was selected to represent England against Scotland at Celtic Park in Glasgow in April 1896. The match, part of the 1896–97 British Home Championship, ended with England losing 2–1, the first Scottish victory in the fixture for 20 years. The match did much to signal the end of the reliance of the Football Association on amateur footballers. It was his only game for England.

Cricket career
Burnup made his first-class cricket debut in 1895 for the Gentlemen of England at Lord's against I Zingari. He made his Kent County Cricket Club debut in 1896 whilst at University and played regularly for the county until 1907. He scored over 1,000 runs in a season for Kent eight times and made 157 first-class appearances for the side. In 1896 he became the first Kent batsman to score a century before lunch in Kent, making his century against Gloucestershire at Gravesend.

As an opening batsman Burnup was considered cautious but was able to score on all types of pitch and could, when required, score quickly. He scored Kent's first double hundred, making exactly 200 against Lancashire in 1900, and scored over 2,000 runs in 1902. In 1903 Wisden named him as one of the five Cricketers of the Year. He made 102 consecutive County Championship appearances for Kent between 1899 and 1903, becoming the first man to play in over 100 consecutive Championship matches for the county. He captained Kent for one season in 1903, taking over from Jack Mason who had resigned as captain at the end of the previous season.

Burnup played an important role in Kent's first County Championship winning campaign in 1906, leading the domestic first-class batting averages, scoring 1,207 runs at 67.05 despite playing in only 13 matches during the season. He was described by The Guardian as "essentially a sound, steady batsman" who contrasted with the flamboyant Kenneth Hutchings, Kent's leading run scorer of the season. He took part in tours to Holland, America and Australia and New Zealand during his career.

Burnup appears in the record books as the only first-class bowler to have 10 runs scored off one ball. This happened when he was playing for MCC against Derbyshire in 1900 during a short-lived trial system where a net was placed around the playing surface. The runs were scored by Samuel Hill Wood.

Later life
Burnup was a stockbroker and businessman in London. He died at North End, Golders Green, Middlesex at the age of 84 in 1960.

References

External links

 
 Corinthian Casuals F.C. – Player profiles

1875 births
1960 deaths
People educated at Malvern College
Alumni of Clare College, Cambridge
English footballers
England international footballers
English cricketers
Cambridge University cricketers
Kent cricket captains
Wisden Cricketers of the Year
Corinthian F.C. players
Cambridge University A.F.C. players
Gentlemen of the South cricketers
London County cricketers
Marylebone Cricket Club cricketers
Gentlemen cricketers
North v South cricketers
Gentlemen of England cricketers
Association football wingers
H. D. G. Leveson Gower's XI cricketers
Lord Hawke's XI cricketers
P. F. Warner's XI cricketers
A. J. Webbe's XI cricketers